Misoscale is an unofficial scale of meteorological phenomena that ranges in size from  to about . This scale was proposed by Ted Fujita, the founder of the Fujita scale, to classify phenomenon of the order of the rotation within a thunderstorm, the scale of the funnel cloud or a tornado, and the size of the swath of destruction of a microburst. It is a subdivision of the microscale.

References

See also 
 Synoptic scale
 Mesoscale

Microscale meteorology

fr:Micro-échelle#Subdivisions